Mexigonus is a genus of North American jumping spiders that was first described by G. B. Edwards in 2003. The name is a reference Mexico, where the first identified species were found.

Species
 it contains four species, found only in Mexico and the United States:
Mexigonus arizonensis (Banks, 1904) – USA, Mexico
Mexigonus dentichelis (F. O. Pickard-Cambridge, 1901) – Mexico
Mexigonus minutus (F. O. Pickard-Cambridge, 1901) (type) – USA, Mexico
Mexigonus morosus (Peckham & Peckham, 1888) – USA

References

Salticidae genera
Salticidae
Spiders of Mexico
Spiders of the United States